Paquetá Island is an island in Guanabara Bay, Rio de Janeiro. The name of the island is a Tupi word meaning "many pacas". The island is an auto-free zone, so travel is limited to bicycles and horse-drawn carriages. Paquetá has twenty baobabs (a type of African tree), the only ones in Brazil beside the baobab in Passeio Público.

History 

Up to the end of the 15th century, the Tamoio Indians used Paquetá as hunting and living grounds. It was officially registered by the Frenchman André Thevet in December 1555, and acknowledged by King Henri II as a French discovery in 1556. Together with Paranapuã Island (now called Governador Island), Paquetá was one of the main centers of French resistance to Portuguese occupation. While the French had the Tamoios as their allies, the Temiminós Indians led by Araribóia supported the Portuguese.

The Portuguese victory was consolidated with the expulsion of the French and the defeat of the Tamoios. Paquetá was then divided into two allotments assigned to settlers; the one now called Campo was given to Inácio de Bulhões and the Ponte area to Fernão Valdez. Even today the characteristics of this division between Campo and Ponte are conspicuously present in the Island's festivities, in football matches and in the parade of dancing and singing groups during Carnival.

Under Portuguese rule, Paquetá produced vegetables, fruits, stone and timber for construction. Aristocratic land and slave owners occupied the island. Nowadays Paquetá presents a residential and touristy profile due to its cultural roots, its scenery and location.

Traditional events 
 Saint Roch (São Roque) Festival, in honor of the Island's patron saint, is held along the week or on the weekend nearest to August 16 when the mass for Saint Roque is celebrated.
 Saint Peter (São Pedro) Festival, in honor of the patron saint of fishermen who keep the traditional maritime procession on June 29.

Notable residents 

 Lucas Paquetá (born 1997)  – Brazilian footballer

External links 
 Ilha de Paquetá / PQT's website center (in Portuguese)
 Ilha de Paquetá's website (in Portuguese)
 Portal Paquetá website (in Portuguese)

Atlantic islands of Brazil
Guanabara Bay
Geography of Rio de Janeiro (city)
Landforms of Rio de Janeiro (state)
Car-free zones